Charles V, Holy Roman Emperor was the heir of several of Europe's leading royal houses.  In 1506, he inherited the 
Burgundian Netherlands, which came from his paternal grandmother, Mary of Burgundy. In 1516, Charles became the king of Spain, inheriting the kingdoms first united by his maternal grandparents, Isabella I of Castile and Ferdinand II of Aragon (the Catholic Monarchs). Finally, on the death of his paternal grandfather in 1519, Maximilian I, Holy Roman Emperor, he inherited the Habsburg lands in central Europe and was elected Holy Roman Emperor.

Blazon

Shield

His "Greater Coat of Arms", the most expansive and formal representation of the lands and titles he inherited, is blazoned as follows (here placed in paragraphs for clarity):
Quarterly: 
I and IV:
Grand-quarterly i and iv:
Great-grand-quarterly 1 and 4: Gules, a castle triple-towered or masoned sable and ajouré azure (Castile); 
2 and 3: Argent, a lion rampant purpure crowned or langued and armed gules (Leon); 
ii: per pale:
Dexter: per fess: 
in chief: Or, four pallets gules (Aragon); 
in base: Gules, a cross saltire and orle of chains linked together or and a centre point vert (Navarre); 
Sinister: per pale: 
Dexter: Argent, a cross potent and four crosslets or (Jerusalem);
Sinister: Barry of eight gules and argent (Hungary); 
iii: per pale:
Dexter: per fess: 
in chief: Or, four pallets gules (Aragon); 
in base: Gules, a cross saltire and orle of chains linked together or and a centre point vert (Navarre); 
Sinister: per saltire: 
1 and 4: Or, four pallets gules (Aragon);
2 and 3: Argent, an eagle displayed sable (Sicily); 
II and III: Quarterly:
i: Gules, a fess argent (Austria (Habsburg (modern) / Babenberg)), 
ii: Azure semy-de-lis or, a bordure compony argent and gules (Burgundy (modern)); 
iii: Bendy of six or and azure, a bordure gules (Burgundy (ancient)); 
iv: Sable, a lion rampant or langued and armed gules (Brabant); 
Overall at the fess point of the quarter an inescutcheon: Or, a lion rampant sable armed and langued gules (Flanders); impaling: Argent, an eagle displayed gules armed beaked and langued or (Tyrol); 
Enté en point: Argent, a pomegranate proper seeded gules supported sculpted and slipped vert (Granada).

Other elements
Supporters: An eagle with two heads displayed sable imperially crowned proper in front of a saltire ragulée gules the whole between two columns argent issuing from the sea proper in base the one to dexter crowned imperially proper the one to sinister crowned with the Royal Crown of Spain proper;  
Motto: PLUS ULTRA (or PLUS OULTRE) wraps around the columns.

Personal arms

The first and fourth quarters represents holdings derived from the Spanish crowns:  that is, the quartered arms of Castile and Leon themselves quartered with the quartered arms of Aragon and Sicily. After 1520 the Aragon/Sicily quartering also incorporated the arms of Jerusalem, Naples, and Navarre.

The second and third quarters represents holdings derived from Charles's Austrian and Burgundian inheritance: these quarters shows further quartering of Austria, Duchy of Burgundy, House of Valois-Burgundy, and the Duchy of Brabant, with the escutcheon in the middle showing Flanders on the left and Tyrol on the right.

The Granada pomegranate is represented at the bottom between the two.

Features

The Burgundian Inheritance and the Order of the Golden Fleece
In 1477, the territory of the Duchy of Burgundy had been conquered and annexed by France. In the same year, Mary "the Rich", the last Burgundian duke's only child, had married Charles' grandfather Maximilian, giving the Habsburgs control of the remainder of the Burgundian Inheritance: although the territory of the Duchy of Burgundy itself remained in the hands of France, the Habsburgs remained in control of the title of Duke of Burgundy and the other parts of the Burgundian inheritance, notably the Low Countries and the Free County of Burgundy in the Holy Roman Empire.  They often used the term Burgundy to refer to it until the late 18th century, when the Austrian Netherlands were lost to the French Republic.  Although Charles V had inherited the grand mastership of numerous orders, the only order which he habitually wore and awarded was that of the Burgundian Order of the Golden Fleece.

Gallery

References 
  Gavira Ignacio, Origins and history of the Spanish coat of arms.

Austrian coats of arms
German coats of arms
Spanish coats of arms
Personal coats of arms
Charles V, Holy Roman Emperor
Charles 5
Charles 5
Charles 5